Yuri Lomov (born April 19, 1964 in Frunze) is a Kyrgyzstani sport shooter. He competed in rifle shooting events at the Summer Olympics in 1996 and 2000.

Olympic results

References

External links
 

1964 births
Living people
Sportspeople from Bishkek
ISSF rifle shooters
Kyrgyzstani people of Russian descent
Kyrgyzstani male sport shooters
Olympic shooters of Kyrgyzstan
Shooters at the 1996 Summer Olympics
Shooters at the 2000 Summer Olympics
Asian Games medalists in shooting
Asian Games silver medalists for Kyrgyzstan
Shooters at the 1994 Asian Games
Shooters at the 1998 Asian Games
Shooters at the 2002 Asian Games
Shooters at the 2006 Asian Games
Medalists at the 1994 Asian Games
Medalists at the 1998 Asian Games
20th-century Kyrgyzstani people
21st-century Kyrgyzstani people